Cathy Sproule is a Canadian politician, who was elected to the Legislative Assembly of Saskatchewan in the 2011 election. She represented the electoral district of Saskatoon Nutana as a member of the Saskatchewan New Democratic Party caucus from 2011 to 2020. She was re-elected in the 2016 election. She did not seek re-election the 2020 election and retired from politics.

While in the legislature, Sproule's critic areas included: Agriculture, Rural Affairs, Environment, SaskPower, Tourism Parks Culture & Sport, SLGA, Saskatchewan Crop Insurance, Francophone Affairs, and Provincial Secretary.

References

External links
 Sproule website

Living people
Politicians from Saskatoon
Saskatchewan New Democratic Party MLAs
Women MLAs in Saskatchewan
21st-century Canadian politicians
21st-century Canadian women politicians
People from Lafleche, Saskatchewan
Year of birth missing (living people)